Amila is a given name which may refer to:

Men
 Amila Abeysekara (born 1983), Sri Lankan actor
 Amila Aponso (born 1993), Sri Lankan professional cricketer
 Amila Eranga (born 1986), Sri Lankan cricketer
 Amila Gunawardene (born 1980), Sri Lankan cricketer
 Amila Kiriella (born 1982), Sri Lankan former cricketer
 Amila Madusanka (born 1992), Sri Lankan cricketer
 Amila Mendis (born 1982), Sri Lankan former cricketer
 Amila Perera (born 1979), Sri Lankan professional cricketer
 Amila Sandaruwan (born 1984), Sri Lankan former cricketer
 Amila Weththasinghe (born 1982), Sri Lankan former cricketer
 Amila Wilson (born 2001), Professional Cook in Botswana

Women
 Amila Glamočak (born 1966), Bosnian singer